The 2019 Sevenoaks District Council election took place on 2 May 2019 to elect members of Sevenoaks District Council. This was on the same day as other local elections. The entire council (54 seats) was up for election. The result was a reduced majority for the Conservatives (down 3 seats) but was still a large victory. Independents made gains, as did the Liberal Democrats. UKIP lost the 1 seat they had won in 2015. No contest was held in 4 wards (Cowden & Hever, Dunton Green & Riverhead, Leigh & Chiddingstone Causeway, and Penshurst, Fordcombe & Chiddingstone), as the same number of candidates as seats up for election ran.

Results

|-

Results by ward

Ash and New Ash Green

Brasted, Chevening and Sundridge

Cowden and Hever

No contest was held, as only 1 candidate ran for the seat.

Crockenhill and Well Hill

Stephen Lindsay was the sitting councillor having been elected as a UKIP candidate in 2015.

Dunton Green and Riverhead

No contest was held, as only 2 candidates ran for the 2 seats.

Edenbridge North and East

Edenbridge South and West

Eynsford

Farningham, Horton Kirby and South Darenth

Fawkham and West Kingsdown

Halstead, Knockholt and Badgers Mount

Hartley and Hodsoll Street

Hextable

Kemsing

Leigh and Chiddingstone Causeway

No contest was held, as just 1 candidate ran for the seat.

Otford and Shoreham

Penshurst, Fordcombe and Chiddingstone

No contest was held, as just 1 candidate ran for the seat.

Seal and Weald

Sevenoaks Eastern

Sevenoaks Kippington

Sevenoaks Northern

Sevenoaks Town and St. John's

Swanley Christchurch and Swanley Village

Swanley St. Mary's

Swanley White Oak

Westerham and Crockham Hill

References

Sevenoaks
May 2019 events in the United Kingdom
Sevenoaks District Council elections